The Hellas International or Greece International in badminton is an international open held in Athens, Greece since 2000 and are thereby one of the most recent international championships in Europe. In 2005, the tournament then upgraded to two star badminton event, the World Grand Prix with the total prize money $50,000. The tournament was held in Thessaloniki, and draws more than 120 players from 22 countries. In 2006, the tournament was known as Hellas International, and in season 2007/2008 it was introduced again in the European circuit as an BWF International Series with the total pursue $5,000.

Previous winners
The table below gives an overview of the winners at the tournament.

Performances by nation 
Updated after the 2021 edition.

References

External links
 Hellenic Badminton Federation

Badminton tournaments in Greece
Badminton in Greece
Recurring sporting events established in 2000